Borshchiv is a city in Chortkiv Raion (since 2020) of Ternopil Oblast (province) of western Ukraine. Borshchiv hosts the administration of Borshchiv urban hromada, one of the hromadas of Ukraine. Population:

History
Borshchiv has been mentioned under its name as the Dudinski family manor since 1456. In 1629 the town, which at that time belonged to the Kingdom of Poland was granted a Magdeburg charter, and the coat of arms, which was the symbol of the House of Vasa. In 1672–1683 the town was controlled by Ottoman Turks (see Polish–Ottoman War (1672–76)) as part of Podolia Eyalet. It was nominally ruled by Ottomans between 1683-1699 and ravaged by Poles and Turks in this period. After Treaty of Karlowitz, it was returned to Poland. After the First Partition of Poland (1772), the town was annexed by the Habsburg Empire. In 1809–1815 it was controlled by the Russian Empire and then returned to Austrians. In 1914–1917 it was taken over by the Russian troops again, see Russian occupation of Eastern Galicia, 1914–15. From 1919 to September 1939 it belonged to Poland, and due to proximity of the Polish-Soviet border, a Border Protection Corps Battalion Borszczow was stationed here. In the Second Polish Republic, Borszczow was the seat of a county (powiat) in Tarnopol Voivodeship.

During World War II, in September 1939, the town was annexed by the Soviet Union. A local newspaper is published here since October 1939.

It was also occupied by the Axis troops in July 1941 and several mass executions of Jews were carried out in the town. In April 1942 a Borshchiv Jewish ghetto was established here. Between spring and summer of 1943, approximately 400 Jews were sent to the Ivanovka camp and more than 2,300 Jews were shot in the Jewish cemetery.

In 1968 the population was 8600 people, there was a sugar factory, a dairy plant, а tobacco factory and distillery.

In January 1989 the population was 11 306 people, there was a sugar factory, a cheese factory, а tobacco factory and distillery.

The Borshov Horizon or Borshovian Horizon is a geological layer of marl and limestone formed in the lowermost Devonian period. Typical specimens of this province have been recorded in the Upper Dniester valleys near Borshchiv where it reaches the surface layers of the land. It is marked by the presence of microscopic Margachitina chitinozoans, certain trilobites and bryozoa dispersed in grainstone. According to Pushkin, waterborne Bryozoa living in shallow lagoons were the dominant life form that shaped the Borschovian plains. Some areas of the Borschovian layer were dominated by colonies of a single species where others were populated by a mix of different Bryozoa.

Until 18 July 2020, Borshchiv served as the administrative center of Borshchiv Raion. The raion was abolished in July 2020 as part of the administrative reform of Ukraine, which reduced the number of raions of Ternopil Oblast to three. The area of Borshchiv Raion was merged into Chortkiv Raion.

People 
 Polish Army General Bolesław Bronisław Duch was born here in 1885
 Contemporary classical music composer Bohdan Sehin was born here in 1976
 Professional footballer Artur Dumanyuk was born here in 1996

References

External links
 Website about Borshchiv with photos and history
 

Cities in Ternopil Oblast
Tarnopol Voivodeship
Cities of district significance in Ukraine
Holocaust locations in Ukraine
Borshchiv urban hromada